Jaider Esbell was a Macuxi artist. His works were displayed at the 2021 São Paulo Biennial and 2022 Venice Biennale.

References

Further reading 

 
 
 
 

1979 births
2021 deaths

Brazilian artists